Sekonyer is a river in southern Borneo, Central Kalimantan province, Indonesia, about 700 km northeast of the capital Jakarta.

Hydrology
It is a tributary of the Kumai River, and is fed by the Camp Leakey River.

Ecology
Part of the river traverses the Tanjung Puting National Park. Travel on the river is often done by klotok, an Indonesian riverboat. The river includes orangutan habitat. The river is brown and murky. Gold mining takes place along it.

Geography
The river flows in the southern central area of Kalimantan with predominantly tropical rainforest climate (designated as Af in the Köppen-Geiger climate classification). The annual average temperature in the area is 22 °C. The warmest month is April, when the average temperature is around 24 °C, and the coldest is December, at 21 °C. The average annual rainfall is 2778 mm. The wettest month is November, with an average of 386 mm rainfall, and the driest is September, with 66 mm rainfall.

See also
List of rivers of Indonesia
List of rivers of Kalimantan

References

External links
Kalimantan 2: Sekonyer River to Camp Leakey YouTube video
Wild Orang Utans near the Sekonyer River on Borneo YouTube video
Photos of Sekonyer by Mike Helliwell

Rivers of Central Kalimantan
Rivers of Indonesia